Kalinino is a rural locality (a selo) and the administrative center of Kalininskoye Rural Settlement, Kungursky District, Perm Krai, Russia. The population was 2,288 as of 2010. There are 28 streets.

Geography 
Kalinino is located 47 km southwest of Kungur (the district's administrative centre) by road. Andreyevka is the nearest rural locality.

References 

Rural localities in Perm Krai